Wokingham Borough Council is the local authority of the Borough of Wokingham in Berkshire, England. It is a unitary authority, being a district council (but designated a borough council) also exercising the functions of a county council.

Elections

Elections to the council are held in three out of every four years, with one third of the 54 seats on the council being elected at each election.

At the 2022 election the Conservative party lost their majority on the council, moving it into no overall control. A joint administration was subsequently formed by the Liberal Democrats, Labour and independent councilors.

Following the 2022 Wokingham Borough Council election, the council is composed of the following councillors:

Premises
The council's main offices are the Civic Offices at Shute End in Wokingham. The building began as a house, built  as the rectory for nearby St Paul's Church. It was purchased by Wokingham Rural District Council in 1939 and converted to become their offices, with the building passing to the new Wokingham District Council when local government was reorganised in 1974. A large extension was added to the west of the original house in 1988.

References

Leader and cabinet executives
Unitary authority councils of England
Borough of Wokingham
Local education authorities in England
Local authorities in Berkshire
Billing authorities in England